The Old Harrison County Courthouse is located in the center of Whetstone Square in Marshall, Texas and is one of the most famous and admired buildings in Texas. It is the signature landmark of Marshall and is frequently used to represent East Texas in travel literature.

The Old Courthouse is listed on the National Register of Historic Places. From 1964 until 2000 the building housed the Harrison County Historical Museum. The building is noted as being the location of the first sit-ins in Texas.

Design
The structure was designed by James Riely Gordon and supervised by a local architect C. G. Lancaster.

The Dome

The building's dome is its most distinctive feature and stands above a four-level rotunda. The rotunda is crowned by a coffered or false dome. Between the coffered dome and the outer dome are the workings of four-faced clock, that has been recently restored. Surrounding the coffered dome are six walls, which would resemble a hexagon if view from above, all of which support the outer dome. On the outside is a false portico aligned with each wall. Where the side of the hexagonal floor plan meet, a V-shaped brick pillar where two sides of the hexagon meet; thus each side of the V-shaped brick pillars span two porticos. In between the V-shaped brick pillars are three marble columns; one on each side of every window set into the walls supporting the outer dome. The windows are aligned to feed light through stained glass insets in the coffered dome hanging over the rotunda.

A cornice extends out over the false porticos and their pillar from the bottom of the outer dome. A balustrade, runs along the top of the cornice which like the porticos below it would appear as a hexagon if viewed from above. Eagle statues are perched wherever two sides of six-sided balustrade meet. The outer dome rise in from the cornice, which if viewed from above would appear as a circle inside a hexagon. The north, south, east, and west side of the outer dome are interrupted by clock faces, which maintain a vertical position even as the outer dome curves backwards. A false belfry, reminiscent of the lantern on top of the United States Capitol building, is located on top of the outer dome. On the top of the belfry is a  statue of Lady Justitia, which has the typical features of any Lady Justice: a blindfold, scales, and raised sword; as well as the rather atypical feature of a set of wings.

See also

National Register of Historic Places listings in Harrison County, Texas
Recorded Texas Historic Landmarks in Harrison County

References

External links

Harrison County Courthouses
View inside the Harrison County Courthouse (Entrance and Courtroom)
Old Courthouse/Harrison County Historical Museum from the Center for Regional Heritage Research, Stephen F. Austin State University

Buildings and structures in Marshall, Texas
County courthouses in Texas
Domes
Rotundas in the United States
Clock towers in Texas
Courthouses on the National Register of Historic Places in Texas
Recorded Texas Historic Landmarks
National Register of Historic Places in Harrison County, Texas
1900 establishments in Texas
Government buildings completed in 1900